Mahesh Premchand Pandey (born 5 April 1979) is an Indian script writer, director and producer of television shows and films. He is known for penning popular shows like Kasautii Zindagii Kay, Kasamh Se, Vidya

Early life 
Pandey is basically from Mumbai with roots in Uttar Pradesh. He gained high school education from Mumbai University.

Career 
Mahesh started his career from Kggk, followed by Kasuati, kutumb, kumkum-ek pyara sa bandhan, karam apna apna and many more daily soaps. He written his first Bollywood film Koi aap sa and directed a Bollywood thriller 332 Mumbai to India in 2010.

Mahesh has also worked in the Bhojpuri Film Industry from the films like Gabbar singh, Rani chali sasural, Sapoot.

Now he is a founder partner of Mahesh Pandey Productions LLP

Personal life 
Mahesh is married to Madhu Pandey.

Awards

References

External links 

 
Mahesh Pandey on Facebook
Mahesh Pandey on Instagram
Mahesh Pandey on Twitter

Living people
Indian screenwriters
Indian directors
Indian television producers
1979 births